Instant Replay: The Green Bay Diary of Jerry Kramer is a book written by Green Bay Packers offensive lineman Jerry Kramer and sportswriter Dick Schaap. Published in 1968, the book covers the 1967 Green Bay Packers season, which ended with the team winning Super Bowl II against the Oakland Raiders. It was also notable because the Packers earned the right to represent the National Football League (NFL) in the Super Bowl (before the NFL's merger with the American Football League) by winning the 1967 NFL Championship Game, more commonly known as the "Ice Bowl", with Kramer making a key block during the winning touchdown. Kramer authored the book by reciting his thoughts into a tape recorder, with Schaap then editing the words into the final written version. In Schapp's obituary in 2001, The New York Times called Instant Replay one of the "best-selling books of its era." In 2002, Sports Illustrated named Instant Replay the 20th greatest sports book of all time. The Washington Post's Jonathan Yardley called the book "the best inside account of pro football, indeed probably the best book ever written about that sport and that league."

References

Citations

Bibliography 

1968 non-fiction books
American football books
History of the Green Bay Packers
World Publishing Company books